Solun Glacier is the 9.3 km long and 4 km wide glacier on Pernik Peninsula, Loubet Coast on the west side of Antarctic Peninsula, situated east of Škorpil Glacier and northwest of McCance Glacier.  It drains the north slopes of Protector Heights, and flows northwards into Darbel Bay.

The glacier is named after the Bulgarian High School of Solun (Thessaloniki), a major Bulgarian education centre during the late 19th and early 20th century; presently located in Blagoevgrad, Southwestern Bulgaria.

Location
British mapping in 1976.

Maps
 British Antarctic Territory.  Scale 1:200000 topographic map. DOS 610 Series, Sheet W 66 66.  Directorate of Overseas Surveys, Tolworth, UK, 1976.
 Antarctic Digital Database (ADD). Scale 1:250000 topographic map of Antarctica. Scientific Committee on Antarctic Research (SCAR), 1993–2016.

References
 Bulgarian Antarctic Gazetteer. Antarctic Place-names Commission. (details in Bulgarian, basic data in English)
 Solun Glacier. SCAR Composite Gazetteer of Antarctica

External links
 Solun Glacier. Copernix satellite image

Bulgaria and the Antarctic
Glaciers of Loubet Coast